Albin Grewe (born 22 March 2001) is a Swedish professional ice hockey right winger currently playing with Ilves in the Finnish Liiga. He was selected 66th overall by the Detroit Red Wings in the 2019 NHL Entry Draft.

Playing career
Grewe began his youth and professional career playing for Djurgårdens IF of the Swedish Hockey League (SHL).

Following his selection in the 2019 NHL Entry Draft by the Red Wings, Grewe remained in Sweden for his second season in the SHL with Djurgården in 2019–20, posting 1 goal in 19 games.

With the intention to further develop his game to the North American style, Grewe nominated and was selected in the second round, 112th overall, by the Saginaw Spirit of the OHL in the 2020 CHL Import Draft. He was signed to a contract to begin his major junior career with the Spirit on 13 July 2020. With the postponement of the OHL season due to the COVID-19 pandemic, Grewe remained in Sweden to continue his tenure with Djurgården.

In the 2020–21 season, Grewe recorded 3 goals and 6 points through 39 regular season games before leaving the club and signing an amateur tryout contract with the Red Wings' AHL affiliate, the Grand Rapids Griffins, on 23 March 2021. Grewe made 11 appearances with the Rapids, collecting 2 assists.

On 18 May 2021, Grewe was signed by Finnish club, Ilves Tampere of the Liiga, to an optional two-year contract.

Career statistics

Regular season and playoffs

International

References

External links
 

2001 births
Djurgårdens IF Hockey players
Detroit Red Wings draft picks
Grand Rapids Griffins players
Living people
People from Sigtuna Municipality
Swedish ice hockey right wingers
Sportspeople from Stockholm County